The 1995 Volvo PGA Championship was the 41st edition of the Volvo PGA Championship, an annual professional golf tournament on the European Tour. It was held 26–29 May at the West Course of Wentworth Club in Virginia Water, Surrey, England, a suburb southwest of London.

Bernhard Langer won his third Volvo PGA Championship with a two stroke victory over Nick Faldo and Paul Lawrie.

Past champions in the field 
Twelve former champions entered the tournament.

Made the cut

Missed the cut

Nationalities in the field

Round summaries

First round 
Thursday, 26 May 1995

Second round 
Friday, 27 May 1995

Third round 
Saturday, 28 May 1995

Final round 
Sunday, 29 May 1995

References 

BMW PGA Championship
Golf tournaments in England
Volvo PGA Championship
Volvo PGA Championship
Volvo PGA Championship